The following railroads operate in the U.S. state of Georgia.

Common freight carriers
Adams-Warnock Railway (AWRY)
Athens Line, LLC (ABR)
Augusta and Summerville Railroad (AUS), operated by CSX and Norfolk Southern
Chattahoochee Bay Railroad (CHAT)
Chattahoochee Industrial Railroad (CIRR)
Chattooga and Chickamauga Railway (CCKY)
Columbus and Chattahoochee Railroad (CHH)
CSX Transportation (CSXT)
First Coast Railroad (FCRD)
Fulton County Railway (FCR)
Georgia and Southern Railway (GASR)
Georgia Central Railway (GC)
Georgia and Florida Railway (GFRR)
Georgia Northeastern Railroad (GNRR)
Georgia Southwestern Railroad (GSWR)
Georgia Woodlands Railroad (GWRC)
Golden Isles Terminal Railroad (GITM)
Golden Isles Terminal Wharf (GITW)
Great Walton Railroad (GRWR)
Hartwell Railroad (HRT)
Heart of Georgia Railroad (HOG)
Louisville and Wadley Railway (LW) (Out of Service)
Norfolk Southern Railway (NS) including subsidiaries Alabama Great Southern Railroad (AGS), Central of Georgia Railroad (CG), and Georgia Southern and Florida Railway (GSF)
Ogeechee Railway (OGEE)
Riceboro Southern Railway (RSOR)
St. Mary's Railroad (SM)
St. Mary's Railway West (SMW)
Sandersville Railroad (SAN)
Savannah Port Terminal Railroad (SAPT)
Valdosta Railway (VR)

Private carriers
GAPS
Georgia Power

Passenger carriers
Amtrak (AMTK)
Metropolitan Atlanta Rapid Transit Authority
River Street Streetcar
Atlanta Streetcar

Defunct railroads

Notes

References

External links
Georgia Railroads

 
 
Georgia
Railroads